Domjur is a census town in Domjur CD Block of Howrah Sadar subdivision in Howrah district in the Indian state of West Bengal. It is a part of Kolkata Urban Agglomeration.It is famous for its gold jewellery industries.

Geography
It has an average elevation of 11 metres (36 feet).

Demographics
As per 2011 Census of India, Domjur had a total population of 18,433, of which 9,040 (49%) were males and 9,393 (51%) were females. Population below 6 years was 1,725. The total number of literates in Domjur was 8,990 (48.77% of the population over 18 years).

Domjur was part of Kolkata Urban Agglomeration in 2011 census.

 India census, Domjur had a population of 16,822. Males constitute 50% of the population and females 50%. Domjur has an average literacy rate of 49%, lower than the national average of 59.5%; male literacy is 43% and female literacy is 56%. In Domjur, 10% of the population is under 6 years of age.

Sastitala is the biggest area of Domjur. Hindus form about 73% of the total population while Muslims make up for nearly 27%. Christians, Jains and non-religious people constitute a minuscule part of the population.

Culture and festivals

Similar to the rest of Bengal, Durga Puja, Eid al-Fitr and  Kali Puja are the three major festivals celebrated here. Dolyatra (Holi), Jagaddhatri Puja, Rath Yatra, Saraswati Puja, Manasa Puja and Christmas are also celebrated in the town. Baruipara Raksha Kali Puja, Bagpara Kali Puja, Domjur BDO Kali Puja, Pancham Dol at Makarchandi Temple are other major festivals of Domjur.

Transport

Bus
Domjur is the junction of Amta Road (part of State Highway 15) and Domjur-Jagadishpur Road.

Private bus
 63 Domjur - Howrah Station
 E44 Rampur - Howrah Station
 K11 Domjur - Rabindra Sadan

Mini bus

 34 Purash - Howrah Station
 35 Hantal - Howrah Station

CTC bus
 C11 Domjur - B.B.D. Bagh/Belgachia
 C11/1 Munsirhat - Howrah Station

Bus routes without numbers
 Bargachia - Sealdah Station (Barafkal)
 Pancharul - Howrah Station
 Udaynarayanpur - Howrah Station
 Rajbalhat - Howrah Station
 Tarakeswar - Howrah Station

Train
Domjur is part of the Kolkata Suburban Railway railway system.

Other  Services

Gio Auto  Domjur  - Munsirhat

Domjur- Jagatballavpur(Maitapukur) 

3 Wheeler Auto Domjur - Dhulagori

Health service
Domjur has its own hospital. Apart from that, there are many nursing homes and polyclinics in the area.

Bank and Insurance
In Domjur town there are several public sector as well as private sector banks such as SBI, Indian Bank, UCO Bank, Punjab National Bank, Bank of Baroda, Canara Bank, ICICI, HDFC Bank, IndusInd Bank, Axis Bank, Bandhan Bank and Ujjivan Small Finance Bank etc. Life Insurance Corporation of India also has branch in Domjur town.

Gallery

References

Cities and towns in Howrah district
Neighbourhoods in Kolkata
Kolkata Metropolitan Area